The 1907–08 Yale Bulldogs men's ice hockey season was the 13th season of play for the program.

Season
Yale began its season poorly, losing its first three games and not contending much in any. However, because those game were against professional hockey clubs, the losses did not harm the Elis as far as the Intercollegiate season went. When they did play their fellow colleges, starting in mid-January, Yale's recent embarrassment against the pros may have lit a fire under them because the Bulldogs torched their next three opponents. After defeating defending champion Princeton, Yale lost its fourth contest to a pro squad before gearing up for their final game of the year. The Elis met Harvard at the St. Nicholas Rink on February 15 and, with both teams entering undefeated against college opponents, the winner would claim the Intercollegiate championship. Yale had failed to overcome the Crimson every season since 1902 but with two goals from John Heron, the Bulldogs were finally able to slay the Crimson dragon and win their fifth intercollegiate title.

The team did not have a coach, however, Tyson Dines served as team manager.

Roster

Standings

Schedule and Results

|-
!colspan=12 style="color:white; background:#00356B" | Regular Season

References

Yale Bulldogs men's ice hockey seasons
Yale
Yale
Yale
Yale